The Jianggezhuang Naval Base is a Chinese naval base approximately 15 miles (24 km) east of Qingdao on the Yellow Sea. The base spans a bay 1.2 miles (1.9 km) across, with the main facilities located in the eastern portion of the bay. Open source satellite imagery shows the base to be an enclosed harbour with breakwaters and a single entrance; there are six piers, a dry dock, various service facilities and an underground submarine tunnel.

The base hosts China's Type 092-class ballistic missile submarine and Type 091-class nuclear attack submarines.

See also
Yulin Naval Base

References

People's Liberation Army Navy submarine bases
North Sea Fleet
Military installations established in 1952

External links 
 http://www.nukestrat.com/china/subcave.htm